The 2007 AT&T Cotton Bowl Classic was a college football bowl game played on January 1, 2007, at the Cotton Bowl in Dallas, Texas, USA. The Cotton Bowl Classic was part of the 2007 NCAA Division I FBS football season and one of 32 games in the 2006–07 bowl season. The bowl game featured the Auburn Tigers versus the Nebraska Cornhuskers.

Background
This was Auburn's first Cotton Bowl Classic since 1986, and Nebraska's first since 1980.

Game summary
The game was tied at halftime. Nebraska scored first on a Nate Swift touchdown catch from Zac Taylor. For Auburn, Carl Stewart caught a touchdown pass from Brandon Cox to tie the score. Stewart ran for a touchdown to give Auburn the lead early in the second quarter, but Nebraska tied it up with a Brandon Jackson touchdown four minutes later. John Vaughn ended up winning the game a 42-yard field goal in the third quarter, as the two teams did not score from that point on. Both teams had two turnovers and six punts. Despite outgaining Auburn 230–178 and having less penalties and more first downs, Nebraska could not get into position to score, especially late in the fourth quarter, when they did not try a field goal at the Auburn 30 on fourth down with four minutes to play.

References

Cotton Bowl Classic
Cotton Bowl Classic
Auburn Tigers football bowl games
Nebraska Cornhuskers football bowl games
Cotton Bowl Classic
January 2007 sports events in the United States
2000s in Dallas
2007 in Texas